Richard Hutchinson Roberts (10 July 1835 – 17 June 1903) was an Australian politician.

He was born in Sydney to businessman Joseph Roberts and Martha Anne Hutchinson. He came from a Camden settler family and owned Roberton Park near Glenquarry. On 22 September 1853 he married Susanna Neich, with whom he had nine children; a second marriage on 11 January 1900 was to Leila Helen Riach. In 1864 he was elected to the New South Wales Legislative Assembly for Camden, but he did not re-contest in 1869. In 1882 he was appointed to the New South Wales Legislative Council, where he remained until his death at Roberton Park in 1903.

References

 

1835 births
1903 deaths
Members of the New South Wales Legislative Assembly
Members of the New South Wales Legislative Council
19th-century Australian politicians